Blues Point Tower is an apartment block in Sydney, Australia. The building is regarded by some critics as one of the ugliest buildings in Sydney.

History
Construction was completed in 1962, and it was Australia's tallest residential building until 1970.

The architect was Harry Seidler and Associates, who had planned a high-density redevelopment for the entire suburb. Reacting to a 1957 suggestion that the area be zoned for industrial use, Seidler proposed that McMahons Point could instead house hundreds of apartments, all with harbour views. Although the industrial zoning was rejected, political support for Seidler's plan quickly faded, and Blues Point Tower was the only element of the plan to be built.

Seidler was commissioned by Dick Dusseldorp, through his company Civil & Civic. The company's site office during construction was located in an 1870s Victorian villa named Bellvue, which formerly occupied the site.

Architecture and heritage value
The heritage listing for the Tower describes it as a "Conspicuous, though unpopular, example of Internationalist style. This landmark building was innovative in its day and intended as a forerunner of a whole movement in architecture and high-density housing".

Criticism
Blues Point Tower is considered by many Sydney residents to be inconsistent with its surrounding buildings and cityscape. Over time, many public figures have criticised it, or even called for its demolition. However, in 1993, North Sydney Council added the building to its local heritage register.

References

Skyscrapers in Sydney
Harry Seidler buildings
Residential skyscrapers in Australia
Residential buildings completed in 1962
McMahons Point